Arsène Do Marcolino Rogombé (born 26 November 1986) is a Gabonese footballer who plays for French club L'Ernéenne Football, as a defender.

Club career
Born in Libreville, Do Marcolino has played club football for FC 105 Libreville, Rennes B, Angoulême, Lens B, Angers B, Les Herbiers VF, Ulisses, Buxerolles, Poitiers, AC Bongoville, AS Bourny Laval and L'Ernéenne Football.

International career
Do Marcolino made his international debut for Gabon in 2006, and earned 6 caps, which included participation at the 2010 Africa Cup of Nations.

Personal life
His brother is fellow player Fabrice Do Marcolino, and his father and great-grandfather were also footballers.

References

1986 births
Living people
Sportspeople from Libreville
Gabonese footballers
Gabon international footballers
FC 105 Libreville players
Stade Rennais F.C. players
Angoulême Charente FC players
RC Lens players
Les Herbiers VF players
Ulisses FC players
Stade Poitevin FC players
AC Bongoville players
Armenian Premier League players
Association football defenders
2010 Africa Cup of Nations players
Gabonese expatriate footballers
Gabonese expatriates in France
Expatriate footballers in France
Gabonese expatriates in Armenia
Expatriate footballers in Armenia
21st-century Gabonese people